Sunken Island or Sunken island may refer to:

 Lost lands existing  or supposedly existing during the past, which have disappeared as a result of natural disasters,

or: a specific geographical place, in the following countries.

Canada
 Sunken Island/Reef, in Canim Lake (British Columbia)
 Sunken Island, New Brunswick,
 Sunken Island, Nova Scotia,
 three different places named Sunken Island in Ontario:
 an island, at 44.83° north, 76.17° west
 a sandbank at 44.13° north, 78.28° west
 a sandbank at 45.79° north, 82.30° west

New Zealand
 Motutara, a usually-submerged island that is exposed if the level of Lake Rotoma drops.

United States
 Sunken Island, Florida
 Sunken Island, New Hampshire
 Sunken Island (Otsego Lake), in Otsego Lake (New York)
 Sunken Island, Vermont
 Sunken Island, Virginia